The Sunniberg Bridge is a curved multi-span extradosed road bridge with low outward-flaring pylons above the roadway edges, designed by the renowned Swiss engineer Christian Menn and completed 1998. It carries the Klosters bypass road 28 across the Landquart River near the village of Klosters in the canton of Grisons in eastern Switzerland.  It is notable because of its innovative design and aesthetically pleasing appearance sensitive to its surroundings.

Design
The bridge was designed by Christian Menn (conceptual design) together with Dialma Jakob Baenziger (final design) as a challenge of integrating the structural form of a curved multi-span extradosed bridge into the larger rural Alpine landscape, given the prominent location of the bridge in the Landquart valley, "but with a certain elegance".

Four slender H-shape piers rise up from the valley floor (8.80m × 4.25m at the base), like the tall trees nearby.

The bridge received the Outstanding Structure Award in 2001 for being "a delicate expression of structural art responding to a sensitive landscape.".

Construction
Construction started Spring 1996, by Batigroup AG and Vetsch AG, starting at the north end with pier P1, the pier closest to the Landquart to Klosters road. Once the piers were completed, the deck were erected using the balanced cantilever method. The bridge was completed ahead of schedule in Fall 1998.

The completed bridge was not opened for traffic because the Gotschna Tunnel, to which the south end of the bridge was connected, was still under construction. Instead, it was used only to access the excavation sites for the tunnel in the interim, until 2005 when the Klosters bypass, including both the bridge and the tunnel, was opened for traffic in a ceremony with Prince Charles, a frequent visitor to Klosters.

Critique
In the 2009 International Award of Merit to engineer/designer Christian Menn, his Sunniberg Bridge, along with his Ganter Bridge, his Leonard P. Zakim Bunker Hill Memorial Bridge as well as others, were singled out as being renown "worldwide for their structural beauty, economic efficiency, technical innovation, and for simply being structural engineering oeuvres of art."

From a 2015 Structural Engineering International retrospective, "The Impact of the Sunniberg Bridge on Structural Engineering, Switzerland", the following points can be made about the impact of the Sunniberg Bridge:
 It was a favorite among structural engineers, ranked no. 5 among most favorite structure published from 1991 to 2000.
 It helped establish "extradosed bridge" as a new and distinct bridge type.
 It is a curved multi-span extradosed road bridge, which is uncommon.
 It is an integral bridge, i.e., it has neither joints nor bearings at their ends, but the girder is rigidly connected to the abutments; thus it is easier to maintain.
 It shows that concrete can be used to build slender structures with elegance.

Gallery
The four piers/pylons of Sunniberg Bridge are numbered from north to south as P1 to P4.

See also
 Landquart–Davos Platz railway, regional train line that passes above the north abutment of the Sunniberg Bridge
 Ganter Bridge, designed by Christian Menn and completed 1980 in Switzerland
 Leonard P. Zakim Bunker Hill Memorial Bridge, designed by Christian Menn and completed 2003 in Boston, USA

References

External links

Extradosed bridges
Extradosed bridges in Switzerland
Bridges completed in 1998
Cable-stayed bridges in Switzerland
Road bridges in Switzerland
Klosters-Serneus
Buildings and structures in Graubünden
20th-century architecture in Switzerland

de:Umfahrung Klosters#Sunnibergbrücke